The Wuling Jiachen is a car produced by SAIC-GM-Wuling through the Wuling brand. It is a compact MPV with standard three-row seating.

Overview 
Positioned below the mid-sized Victory, the Jiachen was launched at the 2022 Auto China and developed specifically for the Chinese market.

Powertrain 
The Wuling Jiachen is equipped with a 1.5-liter turbocharged engine with a maximum power output of 147hp and a peak torque of 250Nm, mated with an 8-speed CVT gearbox. The engine was sourced from GM and produced in China. The fuel efficiency is 7.2 liters/100 km.

Interior 
The seating of the Wuling Jiachen adopts three rows in a 2+2+3 layout. The distance between each row is 80mm and the latter two rows of seats have 800mm of leg space. The rear seat height is 322mm with the longitudinal space above the seat cushion at 952mm and the shoulder space is 1382mm.

References

External links 

  (in Chinese)

Jiachen
Cars introduced in 2022
Compact MPVs
Front-wheel-drive vehicles
Vehicles with CVT transmission
Cars of China